Alexander Kellock Brown (11 February 1849 – 9 May 1922) was a Scottish painter of landscapes and brother of the sculptor William Kellock Brown. He painted in oils and water-colors and exhibited frequently at the Royal Scottish Academy exhibits between 1871 and 1922.

History
Brown received his first drawing lessons in the Free Church Normal School, Cowcaddens. He took night classes at the Glasgow Art School taught by Robert Greenlees. Brown was an apprentice in the designing department of Inglis and Wakefield, calico printers, for seven years. Later, Brown studied at the Heatherly School in London.

Brown traveled and painted with such fellow artists as James Docharty and E. A. Walton

Associations
Brown was involved in many art organizations in Scotland.

References

External links 
 The Glasgow Art Club
 The Royal Scottish Academy
 The Royal Scottish Society of Painters in Water Colours

1849 births
1922 deaths
19th-century British painters
20th-century British painters
Artists from Glasgow
British male painters
Sibling artists
19th-century British male artists
20th-century British male artists